Jiǎo is a Chinese surname.

Notable people
 Jiao Zhe, (矫喆) Chinese football player
 Jiaofu (矯父), 
 Jiao Dayu (矯大羽), an internationally renowned watchmaker, watch appreciation and collector.
 Jiao Yan, Chinese football player.
 Jiao Gong Xian (矯公羨)
 Jiao Gong Han (矯公罕)
 Jiao Songsong (矯公罕), director of Chinese movie animation.
 Kiều Công Tiễn or Kiểu Công Tiện (pinyin: Jiǎo Gōngxiàn) (矯公羡) was a general in the court of Dương Đình Nghệ, a Vietnamese Jiedushi of Tĩnh Hải quân who took over the position in 931
Individual Chinese surnames